Samuel Richard Block (died 11 December 1864) was an English merchant, High Sheriff of Hertfordshire in 1863 and a justice of the peace for Hertfordshire, Middlesex and the liberty of St. Albans.

References

Gallery

Year of birth missing
1864 deaths
Burials at Highgate Cemetery
High Sheriffs of Hertfordshire
English justices of the peace
English merchants